The Sheraton Ankara is a hotel and convention center in Ankara, Turkey. It is run by Sheraton Hotels and Resorts and is located in the Kavaklıdere quarter of central Ankara, near the city's central business district. The complex, which comprises a skyscraper (the hotel tower) and the adjacent convention center building, was opened in 1991. It was designed by the German architecture firm Gerkan, Marg and Partners. According to the architecture firm, the shape of the tower is inspired by a wine bottle, due to its location right next to the Kavaklıdere winery.

With a total of 29 floors above ground and a structural height of  it was the tallest skyscraper in Ankara between 1991 and 2009, and the tallest skyscraper in the Central Anatolia Region between 1991 and 2006.

See also
 Çankaya

References and notes

External links
 
 Sheraton Ankara Hotel in the Emporis database

Hotel buildings completed in 1991
Hotels in Ankara
Hotels established in 1991
Sheraton hotels
Skyscrapers in Turkey
1991 establishments in Turkey
Skyscraper hotels